The 2006 FIBA World Championship for Women took place in Brazil from September 12 to September 23, 2006. It was co-organised by the International Basketball Federation (FIBA) and Confederação Brasileira de Basketball, the Brazilian national federation.

Sixteen national teams competed for the championship. Australia came away with the gold medal by beating Russia 91–74.

Venues

Competing nations

Except Brazil, which automatically qualified as the host, and the United States, which automatically qualified as the reigning Olympic champion, the 14 remaining countries qualified through their continents’ qualifying tournaments:
 FIBA Europe – Spain, France, Lithuania, Czech Republic (European Champion), Russia
 FIBA Americas – Brazil (host),  United States (Olympic Champion), Canada, Argentina, Cuba
 FIBA Africa – Nigeria, Senegal
 FIBA Asia – P.R. of China, Chinese Taipei (or Taiwan or Republic of China), Korea
 FIBA Oceania – Australia (Oceanian Champion)

Squads 

At the start of tournament, all 16 participating countries each had 12 players on their roster.

Referees 
For the World Championship for Women, FIBA selected 25 professional referees:

Preliminary round
 The three best squads of each group qualify for second round.

Legend: Pts: classification points (game won is 2 pts, game lost is 1), W: games won, L: game lost, PF : points scored, PC: points against, Diff.: difference; in green the squads qualified for eighth-final round.

Eighth-final round
 The four best squads of each group qualify for quarter-finals. All Preliminary Round games played by teams qualifying for the Eighth-finals carry over into the Eighth-final standings.

Knockout Stage (São Paulo)
All times local (UTC −2)

5th through 8th place

9th through 12th place

13th through 16th place

Awards

Final standings

References

External links

2006 World Championship for Women.
Official Web of FIBA World Championship for Women of 2006 in Chinese language.

 
2006
International women's basketball competitions hosted by Brazil
2006 in women's basketball
2006 in Brazilian women's sport
September 2006 sports events in South America